The Tondar class (also known as Houdong class) consists of ten fast attack crafts operated by Navy of the Islamic Revolutionary Guard Corps of Iran.

History 
The negotiations to sign a contract for the vessels started in 1991, but was delayed for some time over the type of missiles installed on the ships. The ships were manufactured at Zhanjiang Shipyard, China and were delivered to Iran in two batches, the first five in September 1994 and the remaining in March 1996.

Design

Dimensions and machinery 

Armament 
According to the 2020 edition of "The Military Balance" published by the IISS, the ships are equipped with two twin launchers that fire Iranian-made AShM, Ghader. 2015–16 version of Jane's Fighting Ships however, had reported that the ships carry four Noor missiles.

The close-in weapon system on the ships consists of two 30mm/65 twin AK-230 guns, while the secondary armament is two 23mm/87 twin guns.

Sensors and processing systems 
Tondar-class vessels use Chinese SR-47A surface search radar and RM 1070-A navigation system, both working on I-band. For fire control, they use Type 341 Radar (also known as Rice Lamp) on I/J-band.

Ships in the class 

The ships in the class which were renamed in  2006, are:

References 

Missile boat classes
Ship classes of the Islamic Revolutionary Guard Corps
China–Iran military relations